Precious Makina (born October 2, 1985) is a Zambian amateur boxer who competed at the 2008 Summer Olympics in Beijing at welterweight but lost to China's Kanat Islam.

External links
 Precious Makina at Sports Reference
 

1985 births
Living people
Welterweight boxers
Boxers at the 2008 Summer Olympics
Olympic boxers of Zambia
Place of birth missing (living people)
Zambian male boxers
21st-century Zambian people